The 200 metres at the Summer Olympics has been contested since the second edition of the multi-sport event. The men's 200 m has been present on the Olympic athletics programme since 1900 and the women's 200 m has been held continuously since its introduction at the 1948 Games. It is the most prestigious 200 m race at elite level. The competition format typically has three or four qualifying rounds leading to a final race between eight athletes.

The Olympic records for the distance are 19.30 seconds for men, set by Usain Bolt in 2008, and 21.34 seconds set by Florence Griffith-Joyner in 1988. The men's world record was set at the Olympics in 1956, 1960 (twice), 1968, 1996 (twice) and 2008. The women's world record has similarly been linked to the competition, with records coming at the Olympic Games in 1952 (twice), 1956, 1968, 1972 and 1988 (twice). Griffith-Joyner's 1988 Olympic mark remains the world record for the distance, while Bolt's Olympic record is the third fastest of all-time.

Only three athletes have won the title more than once. Bärbel Wöckel of East Germany became the first to defend the title in 1980 and Veronica Campbell-Brown repeated that feat in 2008. Usain Bolt was the first person to win two Olympic 200 m gold medals at the 2012 Summer Olympics, and at the 2016 Summer Olympics he defended his title to win his third Olympic 200 m gold medal. Merlene Ottey is the most decorated athlete, having won four medals in the event (though none of them gold). Allyson Felix has won three medals, as has Poland's Irena Szewińska. Reflecting how sprint athletes often compete over various distances, many of the medalists in the Olympic 200 metres have had success in the Olympic 100 metres and 4×100 metres relay as well.

The United States has had by far the most success in the event, having 23 gold medals and 57 medals in total. American men have completed a medal sweep on six occasions. Jamaica is the next most successful, with five gold among their seventeen medals, and became the second nation to sweep the men's medals in 2012. No nation has swept the women's medals; the United States is the only nation to have won both gold and silver in the same year (in 1984).

The 1968 medal podium ceremony for the men's 200 metres witnessed a prominent political protest in the form of a Black Power salute by the African-American medalists Tommie Smith and John Carlos. The third medalist, Peter Norman of Australia, wore a badge for the Olympic Project for Human Rights in solidarity.

Medal summary

Men

A YouTube video showcasing all men's 200 metres' Olympic winners can be found here.

Multiple medalists

Medals by country

Women

A YouTube video showcasing all women's 200 metres' Olympic winners can be found here.

Multiple medalists

Medalists by country

Olympic record progression

Men

Women

Finishing times

Top ten fastest Olympic times

Non-canonical Olympic events
In addition to the main 1900 Olympic men's 200 metres, a 220-yard dash handicap race was also held. The winner was J. McGann for the United States, who ran an estimated 22.8 seconds with a ten-yard start. Frank Lukeman of Canada was second, also with a ten-yard handicap, and American C. Turner was third with a two-yard handicap.

This event is no longer considered part of the official Olympic history of the 200 metres or the athletics programme in general. Consequently, medals from this competition have not been assigned to nations on the all-time medal tables.

References
Participation and athlete data
Athletics Men's 200 metres Medalists. Sports Reference. Retrieved on 2014-02-07.
Athletics Women's 200 metres Medalists. Sports Reference. Retrieved on 2014-02-07.
Olympic record progressions
Mallon, Bill (2012). TRACK & FIELD ATHLETICS - OLYMPIC RECORD PROGRESSIONS. Track and Field News. Retrieved on 2014-02-07.
Specific

External links
IAAF 200 metres homepage
Official Olympics website
Olympic athletics records from Track & Field News
A video showcasing all men's 200 metres' Olympic winners
A video showcasing all women's 200 metres' Olympic winners 

 
Olympics
200 metres